Angela Fitzgerald is an American educator and television presenter. Fitzgerald is the current host of Wisconsin Life which airs on PBS Wisconsin.

Early life
Fitzgerald resides in Madison, Wisconsin. Fitzgerald is a member of the Madison Area Technical College Psychology faculty, as well as a professional financial educator with Summit Credit Union. Her work in financial literacy led her to found Brown Girl, Green Money, a social network of women of color working to support the achievement and pursuit of finance goals. Fitzgerald enjoys travel and storytelling. In the past, Fitzgerald worked as the Emerging Initiatives and Volunteer Coordinator for Justified Anger and the Center for Urban Leadership Development in Madison.

Television 
 Wisconsin Life (2017–present)

Notes

External links 
 TV Show Facebook page
 Wisconsin Life TV show website

Living people
American television personalities
American women television personalities
American travel writers
American women travel writers
Travel broadcasters
Madison Area Technical College faculty
Year of birth missing (living people)
American women academics
21st-century American women